This is a partial listing of notable Boston Conservatory at Berklee alumni and faculty.

Notable alumni

Music Division

Theater Division

Notable Current Faculty

Kenneth Amis, tuba
Maureen Brennan, musical theater
Lynn Chang, violin
Pamela Dellal, voice
Doriot Anthony Dwyer, flute 
Osvaldo Golijov, composition
Thomas Gregg, voice
Michael Lewin, piano
Kenneth Radnofsky, saxophone
Jan Swafford, instructor of Music History and Composition
Janice Weber, pianist
Nancy Zeltsman, marimba

Boston Conservatory Leadership
 Julius Eichberg, president, Boston Conservatory (18671893)
 R. Marriner Floyd, president, Boston Conservatory (18931920)
 Agide Jacchia, president, Boston Conservatory (19201932)
 Ester Ferrabini Jacchia, president, Boston Conservatory (19321933)
 Albert Alphin, president, Boston Conservatory (19331967)
 George A. Brambilla, president, Boston Conservatory (19671979)
 Dale A. DuVall, president, Boston Conservatory (19791981)
 William A. Seymour, president, Boston Conservatory (19811998)
 Richard Ortner, president, Boston Conservatory (19982017)
 Roger H. Brown, president, Berklee (2004–2021)
 Cathy Young, executive director, Boston Conservatory at Berklee (20172022)
 Erica Muhl, president, Berklee (2021present)
 Lucinda Carver, interim executive director, Boston Conservatory at Berklee (2022present)

References

External links
 Boston Conservatory at Berklee

Boston-related lists
Lists of people by university or college in Massachusetts